Peter Robinson (born 1966 in Ashburton) is a New Zealand artist of Māori (Kāi Tahu) descent.  He is an associate professor at the Elam School of Fine Arts at the University of Auckland.

Biography
Robinson studied sculpture at the Ilam School of Fine Arts at the University of Canterbury between 1985 and 1989.

Exhibitions
Robinson quickly established an exhibiting career after graduating from art school, and was included in a number of international exhibitions including the Asia Pacific Triennial and the São Paulo Art Biennial (1996), the Biennale of Sydney (1998), the Lyon Biennale (2000), and the Baltic Triennale (2002).

In 2001 Robinson and Jacqueline Fraser were New Zealand's co-representatives at the Venice Biennale, the first time New Zealand participated with a national pavilion at the event. Robinson's biennale work, Divine Comedy, was originally developed while he was artist in residence at the Govett-Brewster Art Gallery in New Plymouth.  In 2006 Robinson first exhibits his Walters Prize winning installation Ack at Auckland's Artspace.  In 2012 Robinson was selected for the Biennale of Sydney, where he filled a massive warehouse space on Cockatoo Island with a huge installation titled Gravitas Lite, crafted from carved polystyrene.

Other exhibitions include:

 Polymer Monoliths IMA, Brisbane 2011  
Tribe Subtribe, The Dowse Art Museum, 2013 
Peter Robinson: Cuts and Junctures, Adam Art Gallery, 2013 
If You Were to Work Here (The Mood in the Museum), The fifth Auckland Triennial, Auckland Art Gallery and Auckland War Memorial Museum
Syntax, Artspace NZ, Auckland, 2015 
Syntax, Jakarta Biennale, 2015
Toi Tū Toi Ora: Contemporary Māori Art, Auckland Art Gallery, Auckland, 2020 
9th Asia Pacific Triennial of Contemporary Art, Gallery of Modern Art, Brisbane, Australia 2019

Awards
In 2008 Robinson was awarded the Walters Prize. In 2016 he was recognised with a Laureate award by the Arts Foundation of New Zealand.

References

1966 births
Living people
20th-century New Zealand sculptors
21st-century New Zealand sculptors
21st-century New Zealand male artists
20th-century New Zealand painters
20th-century New Zealand male artists
21st-century New Zealand painters
University of Canterbury alumni
Ngāi Tahu people
New Zealand Māori academics